Greg Childers is a Republican politician from Oklahoma who served as a member of the Oklahoma Senate from 2011 to 2012.

Political career
Greg Childers began his political career being elected by Oklahoma's Senate District 43 to the Oklahoma Senate on October 11, 2011. He won the seat in a special election held after his predecessor, Jim Reynolds, resigned after being elected as the Cleveland County Treasurer, beating out Democrat Kennith Meador. Childers holds positions on the Education, Finance, Veterans & Military Affairs, Public Safety and Appropriations Subcommittee on Public Safety and Judiciary Committees. In February he endorsed Newt Gingrich for the 2012 election's Republican presidential candidate.

Childers did not run for re-election in the 2012 election, because his Senate district was redistricted and he no longer lived within its new boundaries.

References

Living people
Republican Party Oklahoma state senators
Year of birth missing (living people)